Midnight Club is a racing video game series.

Midnight Club may also refer to:
Midnight Club (film), a 1933 crime film
The Midnight Club, a 1994 novel by Christopher Pike
The Midnight Club, a television series based on the novel